Valéry Arthur Kocou (born 21 December 1983) is an Ivorian footballer, who plays as a midfielder for Stade Tunisien.

Career 
Kocou began his career with Stella Club d'Adjamé and joined ASEC Mimosas in January 2004. He played a role in ASEC's success in the 2006, 2007 and 2008 CAF Champions League. On 18 January 2009, Kocou left the team and joined Stade Tunisien, where he signed a contract that runs until 30 June 2012.

Style 
Kocou is one of the midfielders who enjoys about 50 percent of the club's games. His physicality, ball-winning and passing techniques are very important for the club. His individual and collective spirit are laudable attributes.

References

1983 births
Living people
Ivorian footballers
Association football midfielders
ASEC Mimosas players
Ivorian expatriate sportspeople in Tunisia
Stella Club d'Adjamé players